The 2016 Audi Sport TT Cup was the second season of the Audi Sport TT Cup. It began on 7 May at Hockenheim and finished on 16 October at Hockenheim after seven double-header meetings, all of which are support events for the Deutsche Tourenwagen Masters and 24 Hours Nürburgring.

Entry list
On 7 March 2016, 14 out of 20 drivers were announced.

Race calendar and results

Footnotes

Championship standings
Scoring system
Points were awarded to the top eighteen classified finishers as follows:

Drivers' championship

References

External links
 

Audi Sport TT Cup seasons
Audi Sport TT Cup